The Johns Hopkins Blue Jays men's lacrosse team represents Johns Hopkins University in National Collegiate Athletic Association (NCAA) Division I college lacrosse.
Since 2015, the Blue Jays have represented the Big Ten Conference.

Overview
The team was founded in 1883 and is the school's most prominent sports team. The Blue Jays have won forty-four national championships including nine NCAA Division I titles (2007, 2005, 1987, 1985, 1984, 1980, 1979, 1978, 1974), twenty-nine USILL/USILA titles, and six ILA titles, first all time by any college lacrosse team and second to Syracuse in NCAA era national titles.

Hopkins competes with Maryland in college lacrosse's most historic rivalry, the two teams having met more than 100 times, both joining the Big Ten Conference in the 2014–2015 season.  They have competed annually since 2015 for "The Rivalry Trophy", a large wooden crab.  The Blue Jays also consider Princeton and Syracuse, their top competitors for the national title in the NCAA era, as significant rivals, and play Loyola in the cross-town "Charles Street Massacre". Another heated rivalry is with Virginia with whom Hopkins has competed annually for the Doyle Smith Cup which was first awarded in 2006.  In-state opponents include Towson, University of Maryland, Baltimore County and Navy.

In the past, the Johns Hopkins lacrosse teams have represented the United States in international competition. Johns Hopkins represented the United States in the 1928 Summer Olympics in Amsterdam and 1932 Summer Olympics in Los Angeles where lacrosse was a demonstration sport, winning the tournament in 1932. Additionally, they won the 1974 World Lacrosse Championship in Melbourne, Australia, where they represented the United States.

In late 2012, the men's and women's lacrosse team facilities moved into the Cordish Lacrosse Center, located at the Charles Street (south) end of Homewood Field.

The Blue Jays were not selected for the 2013 NCAA tournament, the first such occurrence since 1971.

On May 17, 2013, President Ronald Daniels announced in an open letter to the Hopkins community that he was accepting the positive recommendation of a committee empaneled to explore seeking conference affiliation for the team.

On June 3, 2013, the university announced that the team would join a "newly formulated" Big Ten as an affiliate member for lacrosse, effective in the 2014–2015 season. This conference will consist of Hopkins, Maryland, Michigan, Ohio State, Penn State and Rutgers. On May 2, 2015, the Blue Jays won the inaugural Big Ten men's lacrosse championship, defeating the Ohio State Buckeyes 13–6.

Up until 2016 the Lacrosse Museum and National Hall of Fame, governed by US Lacrosse, was located on the Homewood campus adjacent to Homewood Field, the home for both the men's and women's lacrosse teams. It is currently located at the US Lacrosse headquarters in Sparks, Maryland.

Championships
Starting in 1926, the United States Intercollegiate Lacrosse Association (USILA) began rating college lacrosse teams and awarding gold medals to the top teams. Johns Hopkins was the recipient of three of these, including in 1928 alongside Maryland, Navy, and Rutgers—each of which had only one regular-season collegiate defeat. From 1936 through 1970, the USILA awarded the Wingate Memorial Trophy to the annual champion based on regular-season records. In 1971, the NCAA began hosting an annual men's tournament to determine the national champion.  The Wingate Memorial Trophy was presented to the first two NCAA Division I champions (1971 and 1972) and was then retired.

Men's lacrosse highlights

Johns Hopkins University men's highlights

Career leaders are taken from the updated Johns Hopkins Record Book.

Career goal leaders

 [a] 9th on the NCAA career goals list

Career assist leaders

Career points leaders

Four time All Americans

[b] Dressel and Turnbull were four-time first-team All American, two of only six in college lacrosse history

Season results
The following is a list of Johns Hopkins's results by season as an NCAA Division I program:

{| class="wikitable"

|- align="center"

†NCAA canceled 2020 collegiate activities due to the COVID-19 virus.

Alumni in the Premier Lacrosse League (6)

William C. Schmeisser Award

Jack Turnbull Award
The Jack Turnbull Award is named for Lt. Col. Jack Turnbull, a Blue Jays star, who died in World War II after his B-24 crashed while returning from a bombing run over Germany.

See also
 Johns Hopkins – Maryland rivalry
 Johns Hopkins – Loyola rivalry
 Johns Hopkins–Princeton lacrosse rivalry
 Johns Hopkins–Syracuse lacrosse rivalry
 Johns Hopkins–Virginia lacrosse rivalry
 Johns Hopkins Blue Jays women's lacrosse
 NCAA Men's Lacrosse Championship
 NCAA Division I men's lacrosse records
 USILA

References

External links

 

NCAA Division I men's lacrosse teams
Johns Hopkins Blue Jays men's lacrosse
Lacrosse clubs established in 1883
1883 establishments in Maryland